The African Trade Insurance Agency, also known as ATI, was established in 2001 by seven COMESA countries and with the technical and financial backing of The World Bank to provide insurance against political and commercial risks in order to attract foreign direct investments (FDI) into the region. ATI is Africa's only multilateral investment and credit insurer and as of 31 December 2019 it had supported trade and investments into Africa valued at over US$62 billion  since inception and for H1 2020, ATI recorded US$6.5 billion in Gross Exposures and US$390.8 million in equity.

History 
ATI was created in 2001 to help drive much needed investment insurance capacity to Africa in order to support higher levels of foreign direct investments. Seven COMESA countries obtained a grant from the World Bank to conduct a study to look at factors contributing the low levels of FDI to their countries. The study revealed political risk to be the main constraint and the primary concern of prospective investors. The study expanded into a World Bank project (The Regional Trade Facilitation Project I)  from which ATI was created. ATI launched in 2001 in Kampala, Uganda  and opened its doors in Nairobi, Kenya, ATI's head office.

Shareholders / Members 
ATI has 18 member countries and 11 other corporate shareholders like the African Development Bank, Trade Development Bank, UK Export Finance (UKEF),  SACE,  Chubb and Atradius. India became the first non-African member country to become a shareholder through its government-backed export credit agency, ECGC

Credit ratings 
S&P: Reaffirmed A/Stable (April 2020); Assigned a Financial Enhancement 'A' rating (refers to ATI's ability and willingness to pay claims) 

Moody's: Assigned A3/Stable (May 2019)

See also 
 African Development Bank
African Export-Import Bank
Africa Finance Corporation
Berne Union
Chubb Limited
 COMESA
ECGC
 MIGA
Mizuho Corporate Bank
MUFG
Nippon Export & Investment Insurance (NEXI)
Sumitomo Mitsui Banking Corporation
The World Bank
Trade Development Bank

References

External links 
 ATI's official website

World Bank Group
International finance institutions
United Nations Development Group
Organizations established in 2001
Intergovernmental organizations established by treaty
International organizations based in Africa
Export credit agencies